Mauro Calamia (born 20 January 1992) is an amateur racing driver from Switzerland.

Career

Karting
Born in Laupen ZH, Calamia began karting in 2004 and raced primarily in his native Switzerland for the majority of his career, working his way up from the junior ranks to progress through to the KF2 category by 2008.

Formula Lista Junior
In 2009, Calamia graduated to single–seaters, racing in the Formula Lista Junior series in Europe for Daltec Racing. He finished tenth, scoring a podium finish at Monza. He remained in the series for the 2010 season, moving to Torino Motorsport, but finished the season in eleventh place in the championship.

Formula Renault
Calamia switched to the newly created Formula Renault 2.0 Alps series in 2011, returning to Daltec Racing. He finished all but one races in a points-scoring position, finishing tenth in the Drivers' Championship. He also contested the Most round of the Formula Renault 2.0 NEC series.

FIA Formula Two Championship
In 2012, Calamia graduated into the FIA Formula Two Championship.

Racing record

Career summary

Complete FIA Formula Two Championship results
(key) (Races in bold indicate pole position) (Races in italics indicate fastest lap)

References

External links
 

1992 births
Living people
Swiss-Italian people
Swiss racing drivers
Formula Lista Junior drivers
Formula Renault 2.0 Alps drivers
FIA Formula Two Championship drivers
Formula Renault 2.0 NEC drivers
International GT Open drivers
24H Series drivers
Nürburgring 24 Hours drivers
Le Mans Cup drivers
GT4 European Series drivers